The Pan American Team Chess Championship is an international team chess tournament open to national federations affiliated to FIDE in the Americas. It is organized by the Confederation of Chess for America (CCA), and the winner qualifies to participate at the next World Team Chess Championship.

The tournament has been held at irregular intervals since 1971. Its most recent edition took place in 2013, which was won by the United States in its debut appearance at the event. Cuba has won five of the nine editions of the tournament, Argentina has won twice, and Brazil and the United States have each won once.

Competition
Each member federation located in FIDE Zones 2.1 to 2.5 is entitled to enter a national team of four players and up to two reserve players. Matches are contested on four . The final standings in the tournament are determined by the number of game points scored by each team. The tournament has been held as a single round-robin except in 1987 and 2013, when a double round-robin was played. Between four and eight teams have participated in each edition of the tournament.

Results

Medal table

Other international team tournaments in the Americas

Team chess events are currently part of the program at the Central American Games, and have sometimes been part of the Bolivarian Games, most recently in 2013. 

Mar del Plata hosted a South American Team Chess Championship in 1989 won by Argentina, and a Mercosur Olympiad in 2009 won by Brazil.

A Central American and Caribbean Team Chess Championship was held annually from 1963 to 1975. Previously, the same name had been given to a team chess tournament held as a side event at the 1938 Central American and Caribbean Games in Panama City, which was won by Cuba.

A Central American Team Chess Championship has been held annually since 2011. A tournament by the same name had previously been contested four times from 1946 to 1953.

See also

Chess Olympiad
Chess at the African Games
Asian Team Chess Championship
European Team Chess Championship

References

Supranational chess championships
1971 in chess
Recurring sporting events established in 1971
Chess in North America
Chess in South America
International sports championships in the Americas